Ari Valvee (born 1 December 1960) is a retired football striker.

During his professional career, Valvee played for Haka, Vasalunds, HJK Helsinki and Pallo-Iirot. His youth club was Euran Pallo. Valvee played 47 caps for Finland. Valvee scored a game-winning goal against Northern Ireland in a 1986 FIFA World Cup qualification match.

References

External links
 

1960 births
Living people
People from Eura
Finnish footballers
Finland international footballers
Association football forwards
FC Haka players
Helsingin Jalkapalloklubi players
Vasalunds IF players
Sportspeople from Satakunta